Manua Patera is a patera, or a complex crater with scalloped edges, on Jupiter's moon Io. It is named after the Hawaiian sun god Manua. Its name was adopted by the International Astronomical Union in 1979. To the southwest is Fuchi Patera, and to the east is Amaterasu Patera.

References

Surface features of Io (moon)